Mak, or LeeMak, is an Adamawa language of Nigeria, one of several spoken by the Bikwin people. The two dialects, Panya and Zoo (Zo), are rather divergent, and might be considered distinct languages.

References

Languages of Nigeria
Bambukic languages